The city of Aberdeen in Scotland has amenities that cover a wide range of cultural activities, including a selection of museums and galleries. There are festivals and theatrical events throughout the year.

Notable attractions

Aberdeen Art Gallery
Grampian Hospitals Arts Trust
Aberdeen Central Library – containing more than 60,000 volumes.
Aberdeen Maritime Museum
The Belmont Picturehouse Cinema
Cineworld Cinema (formerly a Virgin Cinema then a UGC Cinema)
Codonas Amusement Park, Sunset Boulevard & Miami Beach
Doonies Farm
The Gordon Highlanders Museum
His Majesty's Theatre
James Dun's House
King's College
The Lemon Tree
Marischal Museum at Marischal College
The Museum of Education Victorian Classroom
Peacock visual arts
Provost Ross's House (contains the Aberdeen Maritime Museum)
Provost Skene's House
Satrosphere Science Museum
Storybook Glen
The Tolbooth Museum at the Town House
Transition Extreme a £3 million project which contains a skate park and a climbing wall.
Vue Cinema (formerly The Lighthouse Cinema then an ABC Cinema)

Theatre

Aberdeen has a thriving theatre scene with the largest theatrical events being held in His Majesty's Theatre. The smaller Aberdeen Arts Centre is a voluntary run theatre that normally caters for local events, often those held in the name of charity. The Lemon Tree is another small theatre that has small theatrical programmes such as pantomimes at Christmas and small charity events.

Art

Aberdeen gained prominence in the art world by introducing Scottish art to the rest of Britain and the world through the works of George Jamesone. Jamesone's achievements provided the opportunity for other Scottish artists to follow in his footsteps and make their art available throughout Scotland, and the rest of the world. In 1884 a neo-Classical building was built for the purpose of displaying the world's finest art; subsequently this was called the Aberdeen Art Gallery. Within this Gallery the impressive permanent painting collection of Damien Hirst, Ian Hamilton Finlay, Francis Bacon, Monet and Renoir have been held for over 100 years, allowing the inhabitants of Aberdeen and visitors to the city alike to admire their collected works in one central hub.

Grampian Hospitals Arts Trust (GHAT) arose from the simple idea that improving the hospital environment by displaying art made everyone who spent time in the buildings feel better. GHAT strives to highlight culture as a central component of wellbeing and is a sector leader in developing bespoke arts projects for people visiting, working or utilising the services within hospitals and healthcare.

The city is regularly visited by Scotland's National Arts Companies.  The Aberdeen Art Gallery houses a collection of Impressionist, Victorian, Scottish and 20th Century British paintings as well as collections of silver and glass. It also includes The Alexander Macdonald Bequest, a collection of late 19th century works donated by the museum's first benefactor and a constantly changing collection of contemporary work and regular visiting exhibitions.

In 2017, the NuArt Festival came to Aberdeen and saw the installation of street art in many places around the city, including a large mural on the side of the Aberdeen Market.

Places of artistic interest in Aberdeen
 Aberdeen Art Gallery and Museum
 Gray's School of Art
 Grampian Hospitals Art Trust
 Peacock Visual Arts

Famous Aberdeen artists
 George Jamesone
 James Cromar Watt
 John Phillip

Museums

The Aberdeen Maritime Museum, located in Shiprow, tells the story of Aberdeen's links with the sea from the days of sail and clipper ships to the latest oil and gas exploration technology. The museum includes a range of interactive exhibits and models, including an 8.5 m (28 ft) high model of the Murchison oil production platform and a 19th-century assembly taken from Rattray Head lighthouse.

Provost Ross' House is the second oldest dwelling house in the city. It was built in 1593 and became the residence of Provost John Ross of Arnage in 1702. The house retains some original medieval features, including a kitchen, fireplaces and beam-and-board ceilings.  The Gordon Highlanders Museum tells the story of one of Scotland's best known regiments.

The Marischal Museum holds the principal collections of the University of Aberdeen, comprising some 80,000 items in the areas of fine art, Scottish history and archaeology, and European, Mediterranean and Near Eastern archaeology. The museum is open to the public, but also provides an important resource for the University's students and researchers. The permanent displays and reference collections are augmented by regular temporary exhibitions.

Festivals

 Aberdeen International Football Festival (discontinued)
 Aberdeen International Youth Festival — The World Festival of Youth Arts
 DanceLive — Contemporary Dance Festival
 Rootin' Aboot (discontinued)
 Sound — North-East Scotland's festival of New Music
 Triptych — popular music and spoken word (discontinued)
 Word — the University of Aberdeen Writers Festival (discontinued)
 New Words — Festival of New Writing in Aberdeen City and Shire
 Spectra Festival of Light - Scotland's Festival of Light

Music

Aberdeen's music scene includes a variety of live music venues including pubs, clubs, and a number of churches with thriving choirs. The music scene is particularly prevalent in the bars of Belmont Street. Cèilidhs are also common in some of the city's halls. Popular venues include The Lemon Tree, The Tunnels, the Aberdeen Exhibition and Conference Centre, and Aberdeen Music Hall. Aberdonian musicians include Evelyn Glennie, Seb Rochford and Annie Lennox.

See also
 Green Spaces and Walkways in Aberdeen
 Media in Aberdeen

References

External links
The World Festival of Youth Arts - based in Aberdeen
Aberdeen Music - Aberdeen's answer to CBBC, but with more tantrums and hissy-fits
DanceLive - festival of contemporary dance
What's On in Aberdeen - Events guide: music, theatre, restaurants, exhibitions, children's events

 
Tourist attractions in Aberdeen